David Laurence Gold, Baron Gold (born 1 March 1951) is a British lawyer and Conservative life peer in the House of Lords.

In March 2011 he set up David Gold & Associates high level strategic litigation advisors. He was senior litigation partner at Herbert Smith LLP, an international law firm headquartered in London.

On 19 November 2010, it was announced that Gold would be created a life peer. He was created  Baron Gold, of Westcliff-on-Sea in the County of Essex on 1 February 2011.

In January 2013 Rolls-Royce announced that it had retained the services of Lord Gold to review their global anti-corruption compliance policies following bribery allegations in China and Indonesia.

In April 2015, Lord Gold became an adviser to Balance Legal Capital LLP, a leading provider of litigation finance based in London.

References

External links
http://davidgoldassociates.com David Gold & Associates
David Gold (Herbert Smith)
Focus: David Gold: As good as Gold (The Lawyer, 5 October 2009)
http://balancelegalcapital.com Balance Legal Capital LLP

Living people
Conservative Party (UK) life peers
English solicitors
Alumni of the London School of Economics
1951 births
English Jews
Governors of the London School of Economics
Jewish British politicians
Life peers created by Elizabeth II